Private Harry Clay Davis (February 5, 1841 to July 9, 1929) was an American soldier who fought in the American Civil War. Davis received the country's highest award for bravery during combat, the Medal of Honor, for his action during the Battle of Ezra Church in Atlanta, Georgia on 28 July 1864. He was honored with the award on 2 December 1864.

Biography
Davis was born in Franklin County, Ohio on 5 February 1841. He enlisted into the 46th Ohio Infantry. He died on 9 July 1929 and his remains are interred at the Pomona Cemetery and Mausoleum in California.

Medal of Honor citation

See also

List of American Civil War Medal of Honor recipients: A–F

References

1841 births
1929 deaths
People of Ohio in the American Civil War
Union Army officers
United States Army Medal of Honor recipients
American Civil War recipients of the Medal of Honor